The 2016–17 Fresno State Bulldogs men's basketball team represented California State University, Fresno during the 2016–17 NCAA Division I men's basketball season. This was head coach Rodney Terry's sixth season at Fresno State. The Bulldogs played their home games at Save Mart Center as members of the Mountain West Conference. They finished the season 20–13, 11–7 in Mountain West play to finish in fourth place. They defeated New Mexico in the quarterfinals of the Mountain West tournament to advance to the semifinals where they lost to Nevada. They were invited National Invitation Tournament where they lost in the first round to TCU.

Previous season
The Bulldogs finished the 2015–16 season 25–10, 13–5 in Mountain West play to finish in second place. They defeated UNLV, Colorado State, and San Diego State to win the Mountain West tournament. As a result, they earned the conference's automatic bid to the NCAA tournament where they received a No. 14 seed and lost in the First round to Utah.

Departures

Incoming Transfers

Recruiting Class of 2016

Roster

Schedule and results

|-
!colspan=9 style=| Exhibition

|-
!colspan=9 style=| Non-conference regular season

|-
!colspan=9 style=| Mountain West regular season

|-
!colspan=9 style="background:#; color:white;"| Mountain West tournament

|-
!colspan=9 style="background:#; color:white;"| NIT

|-

See also
 2016–17 Fresno State Bulldogs women's basketball team

References

Fresno State
Fresno State Bulldogs men's basketball seasons
Fresno State
Fresno State Bulldogs men's bask
Fresno State Bulldogs men's bask